Tina Stuerzinger (born 26 February 1996) is a Swiss figure skater. She is the 2013 Swiss national champion and competed in the free skate at two ISU Championships – the 2012 World Junior Championships in Minsk, Belarus, and 2013 European Championships in Zagreb, Croatia.

Programs

Competitive highlights 
JGP: Junior Grand Prix

References

External links 

 
 Tina Stuerzinger at Tracings

1996 births
Swiss female single skaters
Living people
Figure skaters from Zürich
Figure skaters at the 2012 Winter Youth Olympics
20th-century Swiss women
21st-century Swiss women